Kanamarayathu is a 1984 Malayalam film written by Padmarajan and directed by I. V. Sasi. It stars Mammootty, Shobhana, Rahman, Lalu Alex and Seema. The story was an adaptation of the 1912 novel Daddy-Long-Legs by Jean Webster. This film won Kerala State Film Awards for the Best Story (Padmarajan), Best Music Director (Shyam) and Best Female Singer (S. Janaki).

Plot
Sherly is an orphan who is sponsored by an old man. On his death, the sponsorship is continued by his son Roy, who is a rich businessman. But Sherly does not know about him. She comes to a college in the city where Roy's niece, Mercy is her classmate and she meets Roy still not knowing he is her sponsor. On the other hand, Alex introduces his brother Baby to Roy, and on Roy's advice Baby starts working in his firm.

At Mercy's birthday party, Baby meets Sherly and falls in love with her, but her mind has already gone for Roy, still without knowing that he is her sponsor, and she rejects Baby. Later Sherly finds that Roy has no feelings for her, although he is secretly in love with her but does not wish to reveal it because of the age gap between them and also because Baby confuses her by lying to her that Roy and Elsie were in love for a long time and couldn't marry because of Roy's father. Sherly is extremely frustrated at this and in a fit of rage goes to Elsie and lies to her that she is pregnant with Roy's baby. Elsie is shocked at this and goes to his office and scolds him for his irresponsibility but Roy tells her that it was not him.

He calls Sherly to his office and shouts at her thinking that she is pregnant with Baby's baby and lied to the doctor that she was pregnant with his baby but she tells him that she was lying to break them up and also to prove her love for him and tells him that she cannot live without him. However, the Mother Superior of the convent informs Roy that she was going to be sent to Italy to learn music and also that she was allowed to become a nun now. And on Mother Superior's advice she decides to become a nun although she doesn't want to and plans to leave to Italy due to her gratitude towards Mother and her sponsor.

So as a final meeting she sees Roy and tells him about this and that she cannot see him anymore. She also meets Baby and tells him everything including that she is an orphan and that she is going to be a nun. He, however, still was willing to marry her but she tells him that she is in love with someone else and he did not accept her so she decided to become a nun. He insists her on telling him who he is and she tells him that it is Roy. At this news he goes to Roy's office and shouts at him for what he did.

But as a last wish she wants to see her unknown sponsor who has blessed her all her life with what she would have never had. Mother Superior meets Roy and discloses Sherly's wish to meet her sponsor before she leaves for Italy, however he refuses. Mother Superior handles over a letter from Sherly, for the very first time without their censoring and leaves. But just before leaving, Sherly is told that her sponsor will meet her. She rushes down the orphanage corridor to find Roy.

Cast

 Mammootty as Roy Varghese
 Shobhana as Sherly
 Lalu Alex as Alex
 Rahman as Baby
 Seema as Dr. Elsie George
 Sabitha Anand as Mercy
 Unni Mary as Anne, Alex's wife
 Sukumari as Roy's mother
 Kaviyoor Ponnamma as Mother Superior
 Bahadoor as Mathappan

Release
The film was released on 27 July 1984.

Box office
The film was commercial success.

Soundtrack 

S. Janaki won the Kerala State Film Award for Best Singer ( Female ) for the song "Kasthuriman Kurunne". The song "Oru Madhura Kinavin" was remixed and used in the Prithviraj Sukumaran starring Teja Bhai and Family (2011), sung by Vijay Yesudas, whose father had sung the original.

Remake

Kanamarayathu was remade in Hindi as Anokha Rishta in 1986 starring Rajesh Khanna and Smita Patil.

References

External links
 

1984 films
1980s Malayalam-language films
Films with screenplays by Padmarajan
Malayalam films remade in other languages
Films directed by I. V. Sasi
Films scored by Shyam (composer)
Sexuality and age in fiction